Negai no Sora was limited single released by Japanese singer Emi Tawata under stage name タワタエミ and indies label AMUSE. This single charted at the #1 spot on the Indies chart in Okinawa. This success gave Emi the chance to go to major label Techesko. Both songs on this single were included on her debut mini-album ∞infinity∞.

Track list

References

2007 singles
2007 songs